Statistics of Emperor's Cup in the 1974 season.

Overview
It was contested by 26 teams, and Yanmar Diesel won the championship.

Results

1st round
Chuo University 6–0 Iwate Teachers
Teijin Matsuyama 1–2 NTT Kinki

2nd round
Chuo University 0–2 Nippon Kokan
Doshisha University 1–2 Nagoya Club
Honda 1–2 Waseda University
Kyushu Sangyo University 0–2 Osaka University of Commerce
Sapporo University 2–1 Hosei University
Mitsui Sosen 0–4 Tanabe Pharmaceuticals
Teihens FC 0–5 Yomiuri
Eidai Industries 2–2 (PK 3–0) NTT Kinki

3rd round
Furukawa Electric 0–1 Nippon Kokan
Nagoya Club 2–5 Yanmar Diesel
Toyota Motors 1–0 Waseda University
Osaka University of Commerce 1–2 Mitsubishi Motors
Hitachi 9–0 Sapporo University
Tanabe Pharmaceuticals 0–1 Toyo Industries
Towa Estate Development 3–2 Yomiuri
Eidai Industries 1–1 (PK 3–1) Nippon Steel

Quarterfinals
Nippon Kokan 0–3 Yanmar Diesel
Toyota Motors 1–2 Mitsubishi Motors
Hitachi 1–2 Toyo Industries
Towa Estate Development 0–1 Eidai Industries

Semifinals
Yanmar Diesel 2–0 Mitsubishi Motors
Toyo Industries 1–2 Eidai Industries

Final

Yanmar Diesel 2–1 Eidai Industries
Yanmar Diesel won the championship.

References
 NHK

Emperor's Cup
Emperor's Cup
1975 in Japanese football